Mehdi Mehdipour (born February 18, 1994) is an Iranian footballer who played as a midfielder for Persian Gulf Pro League club Esteghlal.

Style of play
Mehdipour is a central midfielder, but can play as a defensive or an attacking midfielder. He is known for his high accuracy passing and technique. He is regarded as one of the best playmakers in the Iran Pro League.

Club career

Early years
He started his career with Sepahan for youth levels. Later he joined Zob Ahan academy.

Rah Ahan
He joined Tehrani side with his former coach at Zob Ahan, Mansour Ebrahimzadeh in summer 2013. He made his debut against Iranian club Esteghlal on January 4, 2014 as a substitute. He was released from Rah Ahan as December 2014.

Zob Ahan
Mehdipour returned to Zob Ahan on 26 December 2014. In the 2015–2016 season, Mahdipour was one of the key players of Zob Ahan. Mehdipour played in the return match with Gostaresh Foolad F.C. during the 2015–16 season, scoring two goals.

Esteghlal
On 10 October 2020 he signed a 3-year contract with Esteghlal F.C, and on 25 June 2021 he scored his first goal against Gol Gohar Sirjan. He also scored a second goal from a free kick in the last minutes of the match against Sepahan in the last week of the 2020–21 Persian Gulf Pro League season.

Club career statistics

Assists

International career

U23
He was invited to the Iran U-23 training camp by Nelo Vingada in preparation for Incheon 2014 and the 2016 AFC U-23 Championship (Summer Olympic qualification). He was named to the Iran U23 final roster for Incheon 2014.
He made his senior debut for the Iran national football team on 24 March 2022 against Korea Republic.

Honours

Club 
Zob Ahan
Hazfi Cup: 2014–15, 2015–16
Iranian Super Cup: 2016

Esteghlal
Iran Pro League: 2021–22
Hazfi Cup runners-up: 2020-21
Iranian Super Cup: 2022

References

External links
 Mehdi Mehdipour at PersianLeague
 Mehdi Mehdipour at IranLeague

1994 births
Living people
Sportspeople from Isfahan
Iranian footballers
Association football midfielders
Sepahan S.C. footballers
Zob Ahan Esfahan F.C. players
Rah Ahan players
Tractor S.C. players
Persian Gulf Pro League players
Iran under-20 international footballers
Footballers at the 2014 Asian Games
Asian Games competitors for Iran
Esteghlal F.C. players